A conceptual schema is a high-level description of informational needs underlying the design of a database.  It typically includes only the main concepts and the main relationships among them. Typically this is a first-cut model, with insufficient detail to build an actual database. This level describes the structure of the whole database for a group of users. The conceptual model is also known as the data model that can be used to describe the conceptual schema when a database system is implemented. It hides the internal details of physical storage and targets on describing entities, datatypes, relationships and constraints.

Overview 

A conceptual schema or conceptual data model is a map of concepts and their relationships used for databases.  This describes the semantics of an organization and represents a series of assertions about its nature.  Specifically, it describes the things of significance to an organization (entity classes), about which it is inclined to collect information, and its characteristics (attributes) and the associations between pairs of those things of significance (relationships).

Because a conceptual schema represents the semantics of an organization, and not a database design, it may exist on various levels of abstraction.  The original ANSI four-schema architecture began with the set of external schemata that each represents one person's view of the world around him or her.  These are consolidated into a single conceptual schema that is the superset of all of those external views.  A data model can be as concrete as each person's perspective, but this tends to make it inflexible.  If that person's world changes, the model must change.  Conceptual data models take a more abstract perspective, identifying the fundamental things, of which the things an individual deals with are just examples.

The model does allow for what is called inheritance in object oriented terms.  The set of instances of an entity class may be subdivided into entity classes in their own right.  Thus, each instance of a sub-type entity class is also an instance of the entity class's super-type. Each instance of the super-type entity class, then is also an instance of one of the sub-type entity classes.

Super-type/sub-type relationships may be exclusive or not. A methodology may require that each instance of a super-type may only be an instance of one sub-type. Similarly, a super-type/sub-type relationship may be exhaustive or not. It is exhaustive if the methodology requires that each instance of a super-type must be an instance of a sub-type. A sub-type named "Other" is often necessary.

Example relationships
 Each PERSON may be the vendor in one or more ORDERS.
 Each ORDER must be from one and only one PERSON.
 PERSON is a sub-type of PARTY.  (Meaning that every instance of PERSON is also an instance of PARTY.)
 Each EMPLOYEE may have a supervisor who is also an EMPLOYEE.

Data structure diagram 

A data structure diagram (DSD) is a data model or diagram used to describe conceptual data models by providing graphical notations which document entities and their relationships, and the constraints that bind them.

See also 

 Concept mapping
 Conceptual framework
 Conceptual graphs
 Conceptual model (computer science)
 Data modeling
 Entity-relationship model
 Object-relationship modelling
 Object-role modeling
 Knowledge representation
 Logical data model
 Mindmap
 Ontology
 Physical data model
 Semantic Web
 Three schema approach

References

Further reading 
 Perez, Sandra K., & Anthony K. Sarris, eds. (1995) Technical Report for IRDS Conceptual Schema, Part 1: Conceptual Schema for IRDS, Part 2: Modeling Language Analysis, X3/TR-14:1995, American National Standards Institute, New York, NY.
 Halpin T, Morgan T (2008) Information Modeling and Relational Databases, 2nd edn., San Francisco, CA: Morgan Kaufmann.

External links
 A different point of view, as described by the agile community

Data modeling
Concepts